The 1991 LSU Tigers football team represented Louisiana State University for the 1991 NCAA Division I-A football season.  Under head coach Curley Hallman, the Tigers had a record of 5–6 with a Southeastern Conference (SEC) record of 3–4. It was Hallman's first season as head coach at LSU.

Schedule

Roster

References

LSU
LSU Tigers football seasons
LSU Tigers football